A  Treaty of Perpetual Peace  (also "Treaty of Eternal Peace" or simply Perpetual Peace, in Polish tradition Grzymułtowski Peace) between the Tsardom of Russia and the Polish–Lithuanian Commonwealth was signed on 6 May 1686 in Moscow by Polish–Lithuanian Commonwealth envoys: voivod of Poznań Krzysztof Grzymułtowski and chancellor (kanclerz) of Lithuania Marcjan Ogiński and Russian knyaz Vasily Vasilyevich Golitsyn. These parties were incited to cooperate after a major geopolitical intervention in Ukraine on the part of the Ottoman Empire.

The treaty confirmed the earlier Truce of Andrusovo of 1667. It consisted of a preamble and 33 articles. The treaty secured Russia's possession of Left-bank Ukraine plus the right-bank city of Kiev. 146,000 rubles were to be paid to Poland as compensation for the loss of the Left Bank. The region of Zaporizhian Sich, Siverian lands, cities of Chernihiv, Starodub, Smolensk and its outskirts were also ceded to Russia, while Poland retained Right-bank Ukraine. Both parties agreed not to sign a separate treaty with the Ottoman Empire. By signing this treaty, Russia became a member of the anti-Turkish coalition, which comprised Polish–Lithuanian Commonwealth, the Holy Roman Empire and Venice. Russia pledged to organize a military campaign against the Crimean Khanate, which led to the Russo-Turkish War (1686–1700).

The treaty was a major success for Russian diplomacy. Strongly opposed in Poland-Lithuania, it was not ratified by the Sejm (parliament of the Polish–Lithuanian Commonwealth) until 1710. The legal legitimacy of its ratification has been disputed. According to Jacek Staszewski, the treaty was not confirmed by a resolution of the Sejm until the Convocation Sejm (1764).

The borders between Russia and the Commonwealth established by the treaty remained in effect until the First Partition of Poland in 1772.

References

See also

List of treaties

Treaties of the Polish–Lithuanian Commonwealth
Treaties of the Tsardom of Russia
1686 treaties
Peace treaties of Poland
Peace treaties of Russia
Political history of Ukraine
1686 in the Polish–Lithuanian Commonwealth
1686 in Russia
17th century in Ukraine
Poland–Russia relations
Bilateral treaties of Russia